The Robot vs. the Aztec Mummy (Spanish: La Momia Azteca contra el Robot Humano) is a 1957 Mexican science fiction horror film directed by Rafael Portillo, and starring Ramón Gay and Rosa Arenas. It is the third installment in a trilogy preceded by The Aztec Mummy and The Curse of the Aztec Mummy, and a large portion of the film is an extended recap of the events from the first two entries. The three films were all shot consecutively.

The film remained in obscurity until late 1989, when it was featured as the second nationally broadcast episode of movie-mocking television series Mystery Science Theater 3000.

Plot
The evil Dr. Krupp (Luis Aceves Castañeda), a mad scientist also known as "the Bat", managed to escape the snake pit into which he was thrown by Popoca the Aztec Mummy (Ángel di Stefani) in the previous film and continues his efforts to steal a valuable Aztec treasure from Popoca's tomb. Krupp builds a robot with a human head and brain in it (which is thus, technically, a cyborg), planning to use it to destroy the mummy should he return to thwart his plans. Krupp's former colleague and original finder of the mummy, Dr. Eduardo Almada (Ramón Gay), his wife Flora, and his associate Pinacate, all work to stop the mad scientist from completing his plans.

Dr. Krupp gets inside the mummy's tomb and once again steals the gold breastplate from its resting place on the mummy's chest. When Popoca awakens in a rage, Krupp orders his human robot to fight him. The two monsters engage in a fierce struggle to the death, but the robot's ability to deliver burns due to electrical shocks from its hands quickly begins to wear the mummy out. Just as it seems the robot is winning, Dr. Almada bursts into the tomb and knocks the remote control from Dr. Krupp's hands, effectively shutting off the robot's brain. In an insane rage, Popoca attacks the robot, literally tearing it into scrap metal. Popoca strangles Dr. Krupp and his henchman Tierno, then stumbles off into another tomb where, hopefully, he can return to his rest and no one will ever disturb it again.

Cast 
 Ramón Gay as Dr. Eduardo Almada
 Rosa Arenas as Flora Sepulveda Almada / Xochitl
 Crox Alvarado as Pinacate
 Luis Aceves Castañeda as Dr. Krupp (a.k.a. El Murciélago/the Bat) 
 Jaime González Quiñones as Pepe Almada
 Ángel di Stefani as Popoca the Aztec Mummy
 Arturo Martínez as Henchman Tierno
 Emma Roldán as Maria, Dr. Almada's housekeeper
 Jorge Mondragón as Dr. Sepúlveda (flashbacks only)
 Julián de Meriche as the Commandante de Policia
 Salvador Lozano
 Adolfo Rojas
 Jesús Murcielago Velázquez as El Murciélago/the Bat
 Enrique Yáñez as Esbirro del Murciélago
 Guillermo Hernández as Esbirro del Murciélago
 Alberto Yáñez as Esbirro del Murciélago
 Firpo Segura as Esbirro del Murciélago
 Sergio Yañez as Esbirro del Murciélago

Production notes
The characters Almada and Flor are married in this third film in the series, and Pinacate has given up his masked superhero career as the Angel.

UCLA is mentioned.

While most science fiction takes poetic license with the understanding of science, this film also takes great liberty regarding Mesoamerican civilizations, suggesting the Aztecs practiced mummification and used hieroglyphic writing. In reality, they used pictographs and practiced cremation and simple burial. It was the Inca civilization that practiced mummification, and the Maya who had a system of hieroglyphs. Also, the mummy is depicted in the Egyptian style (upright or lying on its back) rather than in the Inca style (hunched into a ball with its feet pulled to the body and its knees close to the face).

The film was only distributed in 1957 in Mexico by Azteca Films Inc. in its original Spanish language version. English-language dubbing rights were subsequently acquired by entrepreneur K. Gordon Murray, who distributed the film nationally in 1964, on a programmed double feature with The Vampire's Coffin (El Ataud del Vampiro), as Young America Productions Inc. Subsequently, he syndicated it to TV as one of a package of dubbed Mexican horror films which eventually gained a following in the U.S. through their appearance on the USA Network.

Critical reception
Contemporary reviews of the film, or other articles concerning it, have not been located.

Three decades after its release, the TV program Mystery Science Theater 3000 riffed the film in the second episode of the first season, which aired for the first time in 1989. The Canadian comedy series This Movie Sucks! featured an edited version of the film in its second season in 2010.

Home video
The film made its debut on DVD on July 30, 2002, where it was released by Alpha Video. It was re-released again on Mar 12, 2003 by Beverly Wilshire. It was later released in The Aztec Mummy Collection, a 3-disc box set which included the previous two films in the series. It was last released in 2013 and 2014 by Willette Acquisition Corp. and VCI Entertainment, respectively.

Other films in the Aztec Mummy series
 The Aztec Mummy (1957), released as Attack of the Mayan Mummy in the U.S.
 The Curse of the Aztec Mummy (1957)
 The Wrestling Women vs. the Aztec Mummy (1964), featured a similar Aztec mummy named Tezomoc
 Mil Mascaras vs. the Aztec Mummy (2007)

References

External links 
 
 
 
 Episode guide: 102- The Robot vs. the Aztec Mummy (with short: "Radar Men from the Moon," Episode 1: Moon Rocket)

1958 films
1958 horror films
1950s adventure films
1950s monster movies
1950s rediscovered films
1950s science fiction horror films
1950s Spanish-language films
Mexican black-and-white films
Mexican science fiction horror films
Mummy films
Robot films
Rediscovered Mexican films
1950s Mexican films